This is a list of 105 species in the genus Carpelimus.

Carpelimus species

References